Perimeter Church is a megachurch in Johns Creek, Georgia. It is affiliated with the Presbyterian Church in America, and has approximately between 4,000-5,000 members. The church was founded by Rev. Randy Pope. He is currently the President of Life on Life Ministries, and is the author of four books including  "Insourcing: Bringing Discipleship Back to the Local Church" and a discipleship curriculum used globally entitled "The Journey". In September 2019, the role of lead teacher and directional leader transitioned to Jeff Norris.

Facility 
Perimeter Church is located on 110 acres in North Fulton County at 9500 Medlock Bridge Road. About 5 acres of the property includes 2 lakes. There is parking for about 2,000 cars. To facilitate activities for Perimeter School, the church also has a Junior Olympic Swimming Pool, 200 meter track and field, 2 baseball fields that can be converted into 3 soccer fields, and a full ropes course along with a picnic pavilion.

Completed in August 1996, the heart of Perimeter Church, Buildings A & B, are 140,000 square feet. It features a 2300-seat auditorium, a fellowship hall, a gym, and classrooms for Perimeter School. In 2004, renovations added a Youth Auditorium that seats 800 along with a bookstore to the facility. Building C, originally completed in 2000, is the hub for Children's ministries containing the nursery, children's ministry auditorium, and more school classrooms. The 7,000 square foot Annex and Church Offices buildings were completed in 2008. The Day Chapel and Ministry Center were completed in October 2010. The chapel seats 462. Founders Chapel is an outdoor chapel that seats 40. It was completed in 2014. As of late May 2017, a new 9000 square foot atrium and cafe have been established by the main entrance of the church, as well as a new relocated bookstore.

References

External links 
 

Presbyterian Church in America churches in Georgia
Duluth, Georgia
Presbyterian megachurches in the United States
Megachurches in Georgia